Shadrach, Meshach, and Abednego (Hebrew names Hananiah, Mishael, and Azariah) are figures from the biblical Book of Daniel, primarily chapter 3. In the narrative, the three Hebrew men are thrown into a fiery furnace by Nebuchadnezzar II, King of Babylon for refusing to bow to the king's image.  The three are preserved from harm and the king sees four men walking in the flames, "the fourth ... like the Son of God".  They are first mentioned in Daniel 1, where alongside Daniel they are brought to Babylon to study Chaldean language and literature with a view to them serving at the King's court, and their Hebrew names are replaced with Chaldean or Babylonian names.

The first six chapters of Daniel are stories dating from the late Persian/early Hellenistic period, and Daniel's absence from the story of the Hebrew children in the fiery furnace suggests that it may originally have been independent. It forms a pair with the story of Daniel in the lions' den, both making the point that the God of the Jews will deliver those who are faithful to him.

Summary

King Nebuchadnezzar set up a golden image in the plain of Dura (meaning dwelling) and commanded that all his officials bow before it. All who failed to do so would be thrown into a blazing furnace. Certain officials informed the king that the three Jewish youths Hananiah, Mishael, and Azariah, who bore the Babylonian names Shadrach, Meshach, and Abednego, and whom the king had appointed to high office in Babylon, were refusing to worship the golden statue. The three were brought before Nebuchadnezzar, where they informed the king that God would be with them. Nebuchadnezzar commanded that they be thrown into the fiery furnace, heated seven times hotter than normal, but when the king looked, he saw four figures walking unharmed in the flames, the fourth "like a son of God." Seeing this, Nebuchadnezzar brought the youths out of the flames, and the fire had not had any effect on their bodies. The hair of their heads was not singed, their cloaks were not harmed, and no smell of fire was on them. The king then promoted them to high office, decreeing that anyone, who spoke against God, should be torn limb from limb.

Composition and structure

Book of Daniel
It is generally accepted that the Book of Daniel originated as a collection of stories among the Jewish community in Babylon and Mesopotamia in the Persian and early Hellenistic periods (5th to 3rd centuries BCE), expanded by the visions of chapters 7–12 in the Maccabean era (mid-2nd century). Modern scholarship agrees that Daniel is a legendary figure. It is possible that the name was chosen for the hero of the book because of his reputation as a wise seer in Hebrew tradition. The tales are in the voice of an anonymous narrator, except for chapter 4, which is in the form of a letter from king Nebuchadnezzar. Chapter 3 is unique in that Daniel does not appear in it.

Daniel 3
Daniel 3 forms part of a chiasmus (a poetic structure in which the main point or message of a passage is placed in the centre and framed by further repetitions on either side) within Daniel 2–7, paired with Daniel 6, the story of Daniel in the lions' den:
 A. (2:4b-49) – A dream of four kingdoms replaced by a fifth
 B. (3:1–30) – Daniel's three friends in the fiery furnace
 C. (4:1–37) – Daniel interprets a dream for Nebuchadnezzar
 C'. (5:1–31) – Daniel interprets the handwriting on the wall for Belshazzar
 B'. (6:1–28) – Daniel in the lions' den
 A'. (7:1–28) – A vision of four world kingdoms replaced by a fifth

Chapters 3 and 6 contain significant differences. The story of the fiery furnace does not include Daniel, while the story of the lions' den does not include Daniel's friends; the first story takes place under Nebuchadnezzar and the second under Darius; and in the first story the disobedience to the earthly ruler takes place in public, while in the second Daniel petitions God in private. The stories thus supplement each other to make the point that the god of the Jews will deliver those who are faithful to him.

Genre and themes

The legendary nature of the story is revealed by the liberal use of hyperbole – the size of the statue, the use of every kind of music, the destruction of the executioners, and the king's rage followed by his confession of the superiority of the God of Israel. The plot is a type known in folklore as "the disgrace and rehabilitation of a minister," the plot of which involves a man in a state of prosperity who is sentenced to death or prison by the plots of his enemies but vindicated and restored to honour.

When Nebuchadnezzar confronts the defiant Jewish youths who refuse to submit to his will he asks them what god will deliver them from his hands. Their reply is the theological high point of the story: without addressing the king by his title, they tell him that the question is not whether they are willing to bow before the king's image, but whether God is present and willing to save. When the three are thrown into the furnace the king sees four men walking in the flames, the fourth like "a son of god," a divine being.

Interpretation
Daniel's absence from the tale of Shadrach, Meshach and Abednego suggests that it may originally have been an independent story. (According to the Talmud (Sanhedrin 93a), Daniel was out of the country at the time of the incident.)

The Hebrew names of the three youths were Hananiah ( Ḥănanyāh), "Yah is gracious", Mishael ( Mîšā’êl), "Who is what El is?" and Azariah ( Ǎzaryāh), "Yah has helped", but by the king's decree they were assigned Chaldean names, so that Hananiah became Shadrach (שַׁדְרַך Šaḏraḵ), Mishael became Meshach (מֵישַׁךְ Mêšaḵ) and Azariah became Abednego (עֲבֵד נְגוֹ ‘Ǎḇêḏ-Nəḡō). 

The Chaldean names are related to the Hebrew ones, with the names El and Yah replaced by Babylonian theonyms:
Šaḏraḵ may reflect  Šudur Aku "Command of Aku (the moon god)",
Mêšaḵ is probably a variation of Mi-ša-aku, meaning "Who is as Aku is?", and Abednego is either "Slave of the god Nebo/Nabu" or a variation of Abednergal, "Slave of the god Nergal." 

The word "Dura" (where the statue is erected) means simply "plain" or "fortress" and is not any specific place; the Greek historian Herodotus mentions a golden image of the god Bel in Babylon, but the gigantic size of this statue might suggest that its origins lie in folklore. The statue's dimensions (6×60 cubits) are linked intertextually with those of Ezra–Nehemiah's Second Temple (60×60 cubits), suggesting that the king's image is contrasted with the post-exilic place of worship for faithful Jews like Daniel.

Christian liturgy
The Greek Septuagint version of Daniel 3 includes the deuterocanonical Prayer of Azariah and Song of the Three Holy Children. The song is alluded to in odes seven and eight of the canon, a hymn sung in the matins service and on other occasions in the Eastern Orthodox Church. The reading of the story of the fiery furnace, including the song, is prescribed for the vesperal Divine Liturgy celebrated by the Orthodox on Holy Saturday. The Latin canticle Benedicite Dominum is based on the "song of the three youths". It is used at Lauds for Sundays and feast days.

In the Eastern Orthodox Church, the feast day of the three youths, along with Daniel, is 17 December. The Orthodox also commemorate them on the two Sundays before the Nativity of Christ.

In the Armenian Apostolic Church, one of the Oriental Orthodox or ancient non-Chalcedonian churches, the feast day of the three youths, along with Daniel, is commemorated on the Tuesday after the fourth Sunday of Pentecost.

The Lutheran Church–Missouri Synod also includes Daniel and the three youths in the Calendar of Saints on 17 December.

In culture

Literature
 1865: In Anthony Trollope's novel Miss Mackenzie, the protagonist John Ball is a director of two ironically named insurance companies, the Shadrach Fire Assurance Office and the Abednego Life Office. Literary scholar A. O. J. Cockshut called this "Another example of Trollope's fondness for jokes about names." The Spectator in its original unsigned review of the novel in 1865 noted "how happy is Mr. Trollope's humor in inventing names!"
 1963: Martin Luther King Jr. references them in his "Letter from Birmingham Jail"
 1915-1974: Bertie Wooster, a central character in many novels and short stories by British comic author P. G. Wodehouse, makes occasional reference to the three figures, having learned about them in school in the course of winning a prize for scripture knowledge.
 1961: R. F. Delderfield wrote a novel called Stop at a Winner about Abednego Pascoe who survives the furnace of World War II, his two older brothers were named Shadrach and Meshach.
 1976: Robert Silverberg wrote a novel based on this story, called Shadrach in the Furnace.
 1989: Scintillant Orange, a story in William Vollmann's collection The Rainbow Stories, is an elaboration of the S, M, & A tale.

Music
 1734, revised 1774: Il Cantico de' tre fanciulli, cantata by Johann Adolph Hasse (1699–1783)
 1885: The Three Holy Children, oratorio by C.V. Stanford

1930s: "Shadrack", popular song by Robert MacGimsey, performed by several singers including Louis Armstrong
 1955–1956: Gesang der Jünglinge, electronic music by Karlheinz Stockhausen
 1966: The Burning Fiery Furnace music drama by Benjamin Britten
 1968: "The Fourth Man in the Fire" by Arthur "Guitar Boogie" Smith, recorded by The Statler Brothers and by Johnny Cash (1969)
1972: It's Cool in the Furnace, an album of songs written by Buryl Red and Grace Hawthorne followed by a 1973 musical still performed by churches and religious schools
1974: "Loose Booty", recorded by Sly and the Family Stone
 1976: "Abendigo", recorded by The Abyssinians
 1979: "Survival", recorded by Bob Marley and the Wailers, "…like Shadrach, Mishrach and Abednego, thrown in the fire but they never get burn…” 
 1980: "Never Get Burn", recorded by The Twinkle Brothers
 1989: "Shadrach" by Beastie Boys
 1999: "Never Bow Down", recorded by Third Day
 2005: "Abendigo", cover by Sinéad O'Connor of original by The Abyssinians
 2007: "Burn Us Up", recorded by Shane and Shane
 2010: "A Good Name" by Shad
 2011: Meshach Dreams Back by Jane Siberry
 2012: "Into the Fire" by Foy Vance
 2019: "Another in the Fire", recorded by Hillsong United
 2021: "Fye Fye", recorded by Tobe Nwigwe

Film and television
 1995: "Rack, Shack & Benny", an animated video in the VeggieTales franchise

See also 
 The Prayer of Azariah and Song of the Three Holy Children

References

Citations

Bibliography

 
 
 
  
 
 
 
 
 
 

 
 
 
 
 
 
 
 
 
 
 
 
 
 
 
 
  
 
 
 
 
 
 
 
 
 
 
 
 
 
 
 
 
 
 
 
 
 
 
 
 
 
 

 
 
 
 
 
 

 
Angelic visionaries
Biblical dreams and visions
Book of Daniel people
Christian saints from the Old Testament
Groups of Roman Catholic saints
6th-century BCE Jews
Nebuchadnezzar II
People celebrated in the Lutheran liturgical calendar